The Union Leagues were quasi-secretive men’s clubs established separately, starting in 1862, and continuing throughout the Civil War (1861–1865). The oldest Union League of America council member, an organization originally called "The League of Union Men", was formed in June 1862 in Pekin, Illinois. Four months later, on November 22, 1862, the Union League of Philadelphia, the first of the elite eastern Leagues and the second oldest ULA council member, was established (and is still active today, as are the Union League Clubs of New York and Chicago).  

The Union Leagues were established to promote loyalty to the Union of the United States of America, to support the policies of newly elected 16th President Abraham Lincoln (1809–1865, served 1861–1865) and to assure his reelection in 1864, and to combat what they believed to be the treasonous words and actions of anti-war, anti-black "Copperhead" Democrats. Though initially nonpartisan, by the election year of 1864 they were in open alliance with the Republican Party, supporting the reelection of Abraham Lincoln, but were also supportive of pro-Union Democrats.  

The largest and best known of these clubs, formed in Philadelphia, New York, and Boston, were composed of prosperous men who raised money for war-related service organizations such as the United States Sanitary Commission, which provided medical care to treat Federal soldiers wounded in battle at a time when the military was ill-prepared for the scale of need.   

At the same time as these elite clubs were formed, Union Leagues sprang-up throughout the rest of the North, created primarily by working-class men, while women's organizations known as Ladies Union Leagues appeared in towns across the North. In the spring of 1863 these separate, though (mostly) philosophically aligned groups, were organized under the Union League of America (ULA), headquartered in Washington, D.C.

Postwar
During the Reconstruction era, Union Leagues were formed across the South after 1867 as working auxiliaries of the Republican Party, supported entirely by Northern interests. They were secret organizations that mobilized freedmen to register to vote and to vote Republican. They taught freedmen Union views on political issues and which way to vote on them, and promoted civic projects. Eric Foner reports:

By the end of 1867 it seemed that virtually every black voter in the South had enrolled in the Union League, the Loyal League, or some equivalent local political organization. Meetings were generally held in a black church or school.

The Ku Klux Klan, a secret alliance of white supremacists that opposed civil rights and terrorized black voters, sometimes assassinated leaders of the Union Leagues.

Philanthropic endeavors

After the Civil War, members of the Union League Club of New York broadened their support of other philanthropic purposes. For instance, they helped to found the Metropolitan Museum of Art, and funded construction of the Statue of Liberty's pedestal and Grant's Tomb.

Some former Union League buildings have been adapted for other uses; for instance, in Brooklyn, New York, the former Union League Club building now serves as a senior citizens' home. The former Union League building in New Haven, Connecticut, built on the site of founding father, Roger Sherman's home is now a restaurant. In 1949, members of the Union League Club of Chicago raised contributions to found the Union League Civic and Arts Foundation as a public, not-for-profit charitable, educational organization, whose mission is community enrichment.

See also
 Union League of Philadelphia
 Union League Club of Chicago
 Union League Club of New York
 Union League of America Hall
 Union League Golf and Country Club
 List of American gentlemen's clubs

References
Notes

Further reading
 Bahde, Thomas. " 'Our Cause Is a Common One': Home Guards, Union Leagues, and Republican Citizenship in Illinois, 1861–1863." Civil War History 56.1 (2010): 66-98. online

 Fitzgerald, Michael W. The Union League Movement in the Deep South: Politics and Agricultural Change During Reconstruction (Louisiana State University Press, 1989.) online 

 Fleming, Walter L. (1905) Civil War and Reconstruction in Alabama, New York: Macmillan, pp 553–59
 Foner, Eric (1988) Reconstruction: America's Unfinished Revolution, 1863-1877
 Gibson, Guy James. “Lincoln's League: the Union League movement during the Civil War" (PhD dissertation,  University of Illinois at Urbana-Champaign; ProQuest Dissertations Publishing,  1957. 00252270.

 Lawson, Melinda (2002) "The Civil War Union Leagues and the Construction of a New National Patriotism", Civil War History 48#4  pp. 338+.
 Lawson, Melinda. Patriot Fires: Forging a New American Nationalism in the Civil War North((University Press of Kansas, 2002)

 Owens, Susie Lee, “The Union League of America: political activities in Tennessee, the Carolinas, and Virginia, 1865–1870” (PhD dissertation,   New York University; ProQuest Dissertations Publishing,  1943. 7318079).
 Silvestro, Clement M. Rally Round the Flag: The Union Leagues in the Civil War (Historical Society of Michigan, 1966).

 Taylor, Paul (2018) "The Most Complete Political Machine Ever Known": The North's Union Leagues in the American Civil War.  Kent, Oh.: Kent State Univ. Press.

 Tremel, Andrew T. (Winter 2013) "The Union League, Black Leaders, and the Recruitment of Philadelphia's African American Civil War Regiments," Pennsylvania History, 80#1, pp. 13–36.  online

Primary sources
 Fleming, Walter L. (ed.) (1906) Documentary History of Reconstruction: Political, Military, Social, Religious, Educational, and Industrial vol 2 pp 1–29.
 Loyal National League of the State of New York (1863) The Great Questions of the Times: The Great Mass Meeting of the League and Other Loyalists at Union Square, New York

External links

 The Union League of Philadelphia
 The Union League Club of New York
 The Union League Club of Chicago

1879 establishments in the United States
Clubs and societies in the United States
New York (state) in the American Civil War
Working-class culture in the United States